Daniel Turner (September 26, 1796 – July 21, 1860) was a U.S. Congressman from North Carolina (1827 – 1829).

Turner was born in Warrenton, North Carolina as the son of future North Carolina Governor James Turner. He graduated from the United States Military Academy in 1814, and served in the War of 1812 as an assistant engineer with the rank of second lieutenant. As a result of the US Army's post-war reduction, he resigned in May 1815. He was a member of the North Carolina House of Commons (1819–1824). He was elected to the House of Representatives of the 20th Congress in 1827, serving one term. From 1854 until his death, he was superintending engineer of public works at Mare Island Naval Shipyard.

His home, Reedy Rill, was listed on the National Register of Historic Places in 1974.

References

Service profile
Biographical Directory of the United States Congress

1796 births
United States Military Academy alumni
1860 deaths
Jacksonian members of the United States House of Representatives from North Carolina
19th-century American politicians